James R. Webb is an American businessman who is a former president of the United States Judo Association elected in 2006.
He is a former national judo champion,
international coach and international referee,
and holds a ninth degree black belt in judo, a ninth degree black belt in jujitsu, and a second degree black belt in karate.  He currently serves on the board of the US Olympic Committee's National Governing Body for judo, USA Judo. In addition, he has furthered his judo education by attending both the Kodokan Judo Summer Course and Kodokan Judo Kata Course workshops in Japan.  He was a long-time student of 9th Dan Vince Tamura.

Dr. Webb was educated at West Point, the University of Dallas, MIT, Southern Methodist University, and the University of Maryland.  He subsequently provided leadership to such prominent consulting firms as Price Waterhouse, Deloitte & Touche and A.T. Kearney.  Prior to his strategy consulting career, he served as a Special Forces commanding officer.
He is currently a professor and program director  at Southern Methodist University. Dr. Webb is also a member of the Baker Street Irregulars.

References

American male judoka
American jujutsuka
American male karateka
University of Dallas alumni
United States Military Academy alumni
Massachusetts Institute of Technology alumni
Southern Methodist University faculty
Living people
Year of birth missing (living people)
Judo referees